In the sport of cricket, the West Indies is a sporting confederation of fifteen mainly English-speaking Caribbean countries and territories, many of which historically formed the British West Indies. It consists of Anguilla, Antigua and Barbuda, Barbados, the British Virgin Islands, Dominica, Grenada, Guyana, Jamaica, Montserrat, St. Kitts and Nevis, St. Lucia, St. Maarten, St. Vincent & the Grenadines, Trinidad and Tobago and the United States Virgin Islands. The governing body for the confederation is Cricket West Indies (CWI), which is a full member of the International Cricket Council (ICC); beneath the CWI are six territorial governing bodies covering different nations and regions of the confederation. The CWI organises the West Indies cricket team, which represents the confederation in international cricket, as well as administering domestic cricket competitions across the West Indies.

The West Indies cricket team, nicknamed "The Windies", are one of the twelve Test cricket teams, having gained Test status in 1928. They were considered amongst the strongest Test teams from the 1960s, ushering a golden age in which they were undisputed champions for the latter part of the 1970s to the mid 1990s. In One Day International cricket, they have won the World Cup twice and the ICC Trophy once. They have also won the World Twenty20 twice.

Domestic competitions organised across the whole of the West Indies include the Regional Four Day Competition (First-class), the Regional Super50 (List A) and the Caribbean Premier League (Twenty20).

Cricket is also played in other Caribbean territories such as the Cayman Islands, who are associate members of the ICC, whilst the Bahamas, the Turks and Caicos Islands, Belize, Suriname and Cuba are affiliate members. As such, these territories do not form part of the West Indies for cricketing purposes, and field their own separate national teams.

Originally introduced to the West Indies by British soldiers, cricket's popularity spread to the black population and it is traditionally considered one of the most popular team sport in the West Indies and a major part of West Indian culture, although others sports such as association football and basketball have challenged its popularity since the 1990s. Major international cricket competitions hosted by the West Indies include the 2007 World Cup and the 2010 World Twenty20.

History

Origin
Cricket originally spread to the West Indies via the British military. Military officials established cricket clubs, including the St. Annes Garrison Club, and integrated cricket pitches into garrisons in the Caribbean. The first known reference to cricket in the West Indies is believed to be from June 1806, in the Barbados Mercury and Bridgetown Gazette. Two years later, a cricket match was held between the officers of the Royal West Indies Rangers and the officers of the Third West India Regiment. It is believed that the military was a major influencing force behind the drive to begin playing cricket porting this, there were known to be cricket pitches located in many garrisons all around the Caribbean.

Expansion of cricket
During the period of colonial rule, cricket began to be played by the black population of the British West Indies. This adoption was a consequence of constant positive reinforcement from their masters for participating in activities that were familiar such as cricket, and abstaining from those that were perceived as taboo. Eventually, slaves were granted permission to play with military officers (who at one point only played cricket amongst themselves) in restricted roles. Foremost, they were allowed to prepare the wicket before matches, although some were permitted to bowl or retrieve batted balls.

As official cricket clubs began to form, some black players were given the opportunity to play for white-majority clubs. However, many cricket clubs remained exclusively white, which led black players to establish their own clubs that would only allow other blacks to join. Clubs such as the Barbados Cricket Committee (BCC), which was established in the late nineteenth century, adhered to the policy of an all-white team, while Jamaica's Melbourne Cricket Club was composed of only professional black cricketeers. The first inter-island competition took place in 1865 between Demerara and Barbados, at the Garrison Savannah. However, these matches were at first "organized and played almost exclusively by whites." Over time, integrated matches became increasingly more common, as integrated cricket teams competed at first in an attempt to prove their dominance over the other teams of other colonies. Some segregation still existed, for instance the fact that black players were often excluded "from clubhouse refreshment breaks during and after the game". Gradually, blacks began to be employed on professional teams, marking the start of full racial integration in the sport.

The English were eager to promote cricket throughout the British Empire, and on 31 May 1926 the West Indian Cricket Board, along with their New Zealand and Indian counterparts, was elected to the Imperial Cricket Conference (ICC), which previously consisted of the English and representatives of Australia and South Africa. Election to full membership of the ICC meant the West Indies could play official Test matches, which is the designation given to the most important international games, and the Windies became the fourth team actually to play a recognised Test match on 23 June 1928 when they took on England at Lord's in London.

Societal impact
Cricket has traditionally been the most popular sport in the West Indies, both before and after independence. The inclusion of black players into West Indian cricket teams marked a moment of racial integration in West Indian society. Talented black players helped to overturn existing attitudes of white superiority. Cricket helped to serve a dual purpose for the West Indies- before slavery was abolished in 1833, cricket was considered as a constructive pastime for blacks. In that same time period, it was also considered a way for the whites to exhibit their loyalty to the Crown. 

Two noteworthy West Indian cricketers are George Headley, who captained the West Indies in the first test against the touring MCC team in 1947-48, and Barbadian Sir Frank Worrell, who was captain of the West Indies team against Australia in 1960-61. In 2009, Worrell was inducted into the ICC Cricket Hall of Fame. The early 1970s to mid-1990s showed a major increase in the dominance of the West Indian cricket team.  The general historical consensus is that this is due to an increase in fast bowling, backed up by some of the best batsmen in the world. In 1976, fast bowler Michael Holding took 14/149 in the OvalTest against England, setting a record which still stands for best bowling figures in a Test by a West Indies bowler.

Governing body

The West Indies Cricket Board (WICB) is the governing body for professional and amateur cricket in the West Indies. It was originally formed in the early 1920s as the West Indies Cricket Board of Control (and is still sometimes referred by that name), but changed its name in 1996. The Board has its headquarters in St. John's, Antigua and Barbuda.

The WICB has been a full member of the International Cricket Council (ICC) since 1926 and is also a member of Americas Cricket Association. It operates the West Indies cricket team and West Indies A cricket team, organising Test tours and one-day internationals with other teams.

Domestic competition

The West Indies' major domestic competitions are the Regional Four Day Competition (First-class competition) and the NAGICO Regional Super50 (List A one-day competition) and more recently the Caribbean Premier League (domestic Twenty20 competition – replacing the Caribbean T20, which in turn replaced the Stanford 20/20 that had been financed and organized by Sir Allen Stanford).

Other domestic competitions include the TCL Under-19 West Indies Challenge (three-day competition), TCL Under-19 West Indies Challenge Limited Overs Series (one-day limited overs competition), CLICO West Indies Under-15 competition and the WIWCF Women's Senior Tournament. One prominent former competition (not originally organized by the WICB) was the Inter-Colonial Tournament.

In the case of the Regional Four Day Competition and the NAGICO Super50 (and formerly in the case of the Caribbean Twenty20) the following first-class domestic teams participate:
 Barbados cricket team
 Guyana cricket team
 Jamaica cricket team
 Leeward Islands cricket team
 Trinidad and Tobago cricket team
 Windward Islands cricket team

For the NAGICO Super50, a seventh domestic team still participates:
 Combined Campuses and Colleges cricket team

For the TCL Under-19 West Indies Challenge (both the three-day and limited overs competitions) it is the Under-19 squads for these teams which participate, while for the CLICO Under-15 West Indies tournament it is the Under-15 squads for these teams which participate. In the 2004 TCL Under-19 Challenge the Under-19 Bermuda cricket team and an Under-19 combined Americas cricket team also took part.

In the WIWCF Senior Tournament and in the defunct Stanford 20/20 competition the separate components of the Leeward Islands and Windward Islands compete individually. Additionally for the Stanford 20/20 competition teams from outside the West Indies sporting confederation, but within the Caribbean, also compete including the Bahamas, Bermuda, the Cayman Islands, Cuba (which was barred from competing in 2008 by the U.S. embargo), the Turks and Caicos Islands (both competing in 2008) as well as the Dominican Republic and Puerto Rico (announced for the 2009 edition of the Stanford 20/20).

In the Caribbean Premier League there are franchise teams competing, with each franchise currently representing one of the six traditional cricketing territories in the West Indies:
 Patriots – representing St Kitts and Nevis and the rest of the Leeward Islands
 Tridents – representing Barbados
 Amazon Warriors – representing Guyana
 Tallawahs – representing Jamaica
 Zouks – representing St. Lucia and the rest of the Windward Islands
 Knight Riders – representing Trinidad and Tobago

Representative teams

The West Indies cricket team, also known colloquially as The Windies or The West Indies, is a multi-national cricket team representing a sporting confederation of the West Indies.

The "Windies" is one of the twelve elite international teams that play at the Test match cricket-level.

The West Indies women's cricket team made its Test debut in 1976 and its ODI debut in 1979.

References

Bibliography

External links
 West Indies Cricket Forum – News and Discussion
 WindiesFans.com Portal site for West Indies cricket fans
 West Indies Cricket Board
 West Indies vs Zimbabwe Cricket Series 2007
 CaribbeanCricket.com Independent news/discussion site on West Indies cricket
 Westindies Cricketers
 Global Style Cricket West Indies News and Discussion